Anggrameos is an island (class T - Hypsographic) in Nabire Regency, part of the Indonesian province of Central Papua. It lies in Cenderawasih Bay and has a maximum elevation of 139 metres above sea level. It is part of the Teluk Cenderawasih National Park protected area.

Anggrameos is also known as Angra Eiland or Angra Meos.

Reference

Islands of Indonesia